Audrey Mbugua (born 1984) is a transgender activist who has successfully litigated a number of court cases defending the rights of transgender people.

Early life and education 
Mbugua is a male-to-female transgender born in Central Kenya. She attended Kiambu High School from 1998 to 2001. She then studied biomedical engineering at Maseno University from 2003 to 2007.

Activism
She was the first transgender woman in east Africa to legally change her name in official documents and to register the first international transgender-led non-profit in Africa. 

In July 2014 the High Court of Kenya ordered government of Kenya to register Mbugua's lobby, Transgender Education and Advocacy, and pay its legal fees.

In October 2014, in a landmark case, the High Court of Kenya ordered the Kenya National Examinations Council to change Mbugua's name on her academic certificates, which was listed as Andrew, and also to remove the male gender mark on them. Since transitioning, the fact her academic certificates no longer reflected her gender was preventing her from being employed.

In 2014, Mbugua was nominated for the Dutch ministry of Foreign Affairs' Human Rights Tulip award for her activism. In 2018, the government of Kenya was ordered to pay Mbugua USD300,000 to cover her legal costs and special damages.

See also
LGBT rights in Kenya

References

External links

1984 births
Living people
Kenyan activists
Kenyan women activists
Kenyan LGBT people
Transgender women
Transgender rights activists
Transgender law
Women civil rights activists
21st-century LGBT people